The cinereous becard (Pachyramphus rufus) is a species of bird in the family Tityridae. The term cinereous describes its colouration.  It has traditionally been placed in Cotingidae or Tyrannidae, but evidence strongly suggest it is better placed in Tityridae, where it is now placed by the South American Classification Committee.

It is found in Brazil, Colombia, Ecuador, French Guiana, Guyana, Panama, Peru, Suriname, and Venezuela. Its natural habitats are subtropical or tropical moist lowland forests, subtropical or tropical dry shrubland, and heavily degraded former forest.

Taxonomy
The cinereous becard was described by the French polymath Georges-Louis Leclerc, Comte de Buffon in 1779 in his Histoire Naturelle des Oiseaux from a specimen collected in Cayenne, French Guiana. Neither the plate caption nor Buffon's description included a scientific name but in 1783 the Dutch naturalist Pieter Boddaert coined the binomial name Muscicapa rufa in his catalogue of the Planches Enluminées. The cinereous becard is now placed in the genus Pachyramphus that was introduced in 1839 by the English zoologist George Robert Gray. The generic name is from the Ancient Greek pakhus meaning "stout" or "thick" and rhamphos meaning "bill". The specific epithet rufus is Latin for "red".

References

Pachyramphus
Birds described in 1783
Taxonomy articles created by Polbot